Dictator is a 2016 Indian Telugu-language action film, jointly produced by Eros International & Sriwass under Vedhaaswa Creations banner and directed by Sriwass. The film stars Nandamuri Balakrishna, Anjali, Sonal Chauhan and  Vikramjeet Virk music is composed by S. Thaman.

It is the 99th movie in the career of Nandamuri Balakrishna. The film's script was written by Sridhar Seepana, Gopimohan and Kona Venkat while the dialogues were written by M. Ratnam. The movie had released on 14 January 2016 as Sankranthi Release. Later the movie was dubbed into Hindi as Yudh: Ek Jung by Cinekorn Movies in 2016.

Plot
The film begins with Chandu, an employee at Dharma Group of Industries, who lives with his wife Katyayani's family in Hyderabad. As it happens, Katyayani is working in Delhi. An aspiring actress Indu befriends Chandu. She is in a quandary due to gangsters who are hunting her brother. She is abducted when Chandu confronts them and conflicts with Minister Goverdhan Rao and a wicked cop Prabhakar. At the same time, Babji, his co-employee, heists the company for his daughter's nuptials, and Chandu incriminates himself. The attention of company Chairman Rajashekar Dharma is thrust upon him when his father-in-law Lakshmi Narayana seeks the truth. The true identity of Chandu is surprisingly revealed as Chandrashekar Dharma The Dictator, Chairman of the Dharma group of companies.

Chandrasekhar Dharma is a big tycoon in India who fights against the mafia and businessmen in Delhi. He gets acquainted with Katyayani, an employee in his company, and falls for her. Since Lakshmi Narayana is against the elite of society, she introduces him as her colleague and they got along. After some time, Chandrasekhar battles a tyrant woman, Mahima Roy, for murdering his fatherly figure, Hari Prasad, with her malicious son-in-law Viswambhar. Mahima kidnaps Chandrasekhar's family and demands he fall at her feet, at which point Mahima receives multiple calls from her relatives from around the world, affirming that Chandrashekar has taken them into his custody. Later, Chandrasekhar eliminates Viswambhar when Mahima sends him again. In the altercation Katyayani is stabbed. At that point, Chandrasekhar leaves Delhi at the request of Katyayani, changing his identity.

Chandrasekhar is conscious that Viswambhar is still alive because of the betrayal of his men, so he returns to Delhi. One of Chandrasekhar's family members, Sivaram, backstabs and informs Viswambhar that Chandrasekhar is going to conduct necessary rites for the dead Hari Prasad. Being cognizant of it, Viswambhar decides to knock him out and goes after Chandrasekhar. Sivaram then takes the side of Chandrasekhar, claiming it is a trap for Viswambhar. At last, Chandrasekhar slays Viswambhar and behests Mahima to leave the country. In the end, Chandrasekhar returns as Chandrasekhar Dharma, The Dictator.

Cast

Nandamuri Balakrishna as Chandrashekhar Dharma "Chandu"/ Dictator 
Anjali as Kathyayani, Chandu's wife
Sonal Chauhan as Indu, neighbour
Vikramjeet Virk as Vicky Bhai
Rati Agnihotri as Mahima Rai
Kulbhushan Kharbanda as Hari Prasad
Aksha Pardasany as Shruti, Kathyayani's friend
Nassar as Lakshmi Narayana, Kathyayani's father
Suman as Rajashekar Dharma, Chandu's brother
Nawab Shah as Viswambhar, Mahima's son-in-law
Kabir Duhan Singh as Pandu Bhai
Sayaji Shinde as Bokha Sivaram
Chalapathi Rao as I.G.
Vennela Kishore as Kathyayani's brother
Rajiv Kanakala as Indu's brother
Raghu Babu as Vasthu Bheeshmacharya
Y. Kasi Viswanath as Babji
Prudhviraj as Ramesh Patro
Posani Krishna Murali as Chandrashekhar Dharma's P.A.
Ajay as Inspector Prabhakar (Corrupted Police Officer)
Madhusudhan Rao as Minister Goverdhan Rao
Ravi Prakash as Inspector Rasool
Ravi Babu as Director
Vamsi Krishna as Minister's son
Kalyani Natarajan as Mrs. Lakshmi Narayana
Pavitra Lokesh as Rajashekar's wife
Ashok Kumar as Lakshmi Narayana's brother
Prabhas Sreenu as Prabha
Duvvasi Mohan as Prasad
Hema as Hema Patnaik
G. V. Sudhakar Naidu as Goon
Ravi Varma as Shruti's husband
Satya Prakash as Saxena
Banerjee as Mahima Rai's P.A.
Shawar Ali
Gundu Sudarshan
Giridhar as Kathyayani's brother
Ping Pong Surya as Babji's son
Mukhtar Khan as Goon
Deekshithulu as Rasool's assistant
Ambati Srinivas as Minister's son P.A.
Lab Sarath as Doctor
Junior Relangi as Kishanji
Shraddha Das as item number "Tingo Tingo"
Mumaith Khan as item number "Tingo Tingo"

Soundtrack

Music composed by S. Thaman. Music released on EROS Music Company. The music of the film was launched on 20 December 2015 at Amaravati, the new Capital city of Andhra Pradesh. This movie was the first to release its audio at Amaravati.  As this movie is 99th film in Balakrishna's career, the association of 'Balayya Helping Hands' organised a rally from KBR Park, Hyderabad to Audio Launch Venue at Amaravati with 99 cars with the permission of Government of Andhra Pradesh. First Audio CD copy was released by Rayapati Sambasiva Rao and presented it to Balakrishna. Anjali, Andhra Pradesh's Agriculture Minister Prathipati Pulla Rao, Ravela Kishore Babu, Sonal Chouhan, Korrapati Ranganatha Sai, Anil Sunkara, Ram Achanta, Ramajogayya Sastry, Shyam K. Naidu, Brahma Kadali, Ambika krishna, Sreedhar Seepana, Kona Venkat, Gopi Mohan, Raghu Babu and others were present at this event.

Reception

Indiaglitz in its review states that "Dictator is an album that is for the mass and class audiences alike.  Chura Chura.. stands out and is sure to be on the chartbusters.  Gana Gana works lyrically."

Production
Production of this action drama film began at Ramanaidu Studios in Hyderabad on 29 May 2015. Telugu actress Anjali and Balakrishna will star in this film, to be produced and directed by Sriwass (Loukyam fame). In early July 2015, actress Sonal Chauhan was signed as one of the female lead in the film. This movie is the first Telugu film produced by Eros International Media Limited. Regular shooting for this film commenced on 20 July 2015. The lead actor Nandamuri Balakrishna lost 12 Kilograms of weight for the role in this movie. A wonderful set was built in Ramanaidu Studios, Hyderabad for this movie. First schedule of the movie with few action sequences was shot in this set for 25 days. Introduction song written by Ramajogayya Sastry titled Gam Gam Gam Ganesha... Gouri Tanaya Sarvesha... with theme on Lord Ganesha was shot in a big set designed by Brahma Kadali at Chithrapuri Colony, Hyderabad with 99 dancers and more than 2000 junior artists under the choreographer Prem Rakshith.

On 24 August 2015, Eros International Media Ltd released a press note saying that the movie had completed its first schedule in Hyderabad. Second schedule of this movie was planned in Europe where some talkie part, few fights and songs was shot. In the end of August 2015, the movie unit started shooting in Bulgaria at exotic locations. The movie unit completed another schedule at Delhi on 2 December 2015; and the final schedule with heavy mass, fight sequences in the second week of December at Hyderabad. On 18 December 2015, the film director Sriwass announced that shooting part was complete except for one song. The last song Tingo Tingo under choreography of Prem Rakshith, was shot at Hyderabad completing the shooting part of the film. Shraddha Das and the popular Item song dancer Mumaith Khan paired up with Balakrishna in this song.

Box office
Dictator collected ₹ 10 crore gross at the worldwide box office on its first day, and fetched its distributors ₹ 7.5 crore. It has beaten the record of Lion and become the second-biggest opener for Balakrishna after Legend. It has collected ₹18 crore gross at the AP/Telangana box office in its four-day-extended first weekend.

References

External links
 

2016 films
2010s Telugu-language films
Films scored by Thaman S
2016 masala films
Indian action films
Films with screenplays by Kona Venkat
Films directed by Sriwass
2016 action films